WhyHotel is an alternative hospitality service provider that creates pop-up hotels. The company uses yet-to-be-leased units in new apartment buildings as fully furnished hotel suites. As such, the company does not own any real estate listings. The company is headquartered in Washington, DC.

History 
WhyHotel was founded in January 2017 by friends and real estate developers Jason Fudin, while he was working as an executive at Vornado Realty Trust, and Bao Vuong, as he was working as a Vice President of Development at PN Hoffman. The pair met in 2011 as volunteers at a real estate development organization.

The company's first pop-up hotel was a pilot program from January to May 2017 which included 50 empty units at The Bartlett in Pentagon City, VA, owned by Vornado Realty Trust, that were yet to be leased by long-term tenants. WhyHotel then spun off of Vornado Realty and became an independent, venture-backed startup in the summer of 2017.

The company received $3.9 million in seed funding in June 2018, $10 million in Series A funding in December 2018 and $20 million in Series B funding in December 2019.  

In 2018 WhyHotel opened pop-up hotels in Baltimore, MD in June,  and Washington, D.C. in October. The following year, WhyHotel opened pop-up hotels in Ballston in April 2019, Seattle in September 2019, and Tysons Corner, VA in December 2019. In 2020, the company has opened a pop-up hotel in Houston and announced new locations in Maryland, and Arlington.

In May 2019, WhyHotel announced a new business arm called Hospitality Living, which aims to deliver flexible use home and hotel buildings constructed by WhyHotel. The company aims to construct the first of this type of building in 2022.

Product overview

Hosts 
Each location is staffed with “hosts” that offer on-site hospitality services to guests akin to traditional hotels, such as 24-hour in-house concierge service.

Legality of hosting 
Each location operates under a hotel license with all required regulatory approval before opening. WhyHotel also shares expenses associated with each building, including electricity, real estate taxes and other common-area maintenance costs. WhyHotel's business model avoids converting apartment units permanently to hotel rooms eliminating the controversy of housing becoming tourist lodging.

References 

Hospitality companies of the United States
Companies based in Washington, D.C.
2017 establishments in Washington, D.C.
Hospitality companies established in 2017
American companies established in 2017